The term Broodmother can mean:

 a type of hero in Defense of the Ancients (DotA)
 a type of Darkspawn creature in the Dragon Age media franchise
 a Zerg unit in Starcraft 2